Emma was a six-part TV serial adaptation of Jane Austen's 1815 novel Emma by BBC Television that was broadcast in 1972. It was directed by John Glenister.

This dramatization brings to life the wit and humour of Jane Austen's arguably finest novel Emma, recreating her most irritatingly endearing female character, of whom she wrote "no one but myself could like."

Emma presides over the small provincial world of Highbury with enthusiasm, but she will find that it is all too easy to confuse good intentions with self-gratification. The often insensitive, well-meaning, incorrigible Emma Woodhouse having engineered the marriage of governess, companion and friend Miss Taylor, now turns her attention towards making a match for Mr Elton, the local vicar, and her new protégée Harriet Smith. Her one voice of reason and restraint is Mr Knightley, who has known her since she was a child and who watches her behaviour with wry amusement and sometimes with real anger.

Cast and crew 
 Doran Godwin – Emma Woodhouse
 John Carson – George Knightley
 Donald Eccles – Mr Woodhouse
 Constance Chapman – Miss Bates
 Robert East – Frank Churchill
 Ania Marson – Jane Fairfax
 Ellen Dryden – Mrs Weston
 Raymond Adamson – Mr. Weston
 Fiona Walker – Mrs Elton
 Timothy Peters – Mr Elton
 Debbie Bowen – Harriet Smith
 John Alkin – Robert Martin
 Mary Holder – Mrs Bates
 Vivienne Moore – Williams
 Amber Thomas – Patty
 Hilda Fenemore – Mrs Cole
 Norman Atkyns – Shop Assistant
 Meg Gleed – Isabella Knightley
 John Kelland – John Knightley
 Belinda Tighe, Yves Tighe, Arran Tighe, Emma Horton – The Knightley Children
 Mollie Sugden – Mrs Goddard
 Lala Lloyd – Mrs Ford
 Marian Tanner – Betty Bickerton
 Sam Williams – Gypsy Boy
 Tom McCall, David Butt, Christopher Green – Musicians

References

External links 

 

1972 British television series debuts
1972 British television series endings
Television series based on Emma (novel)
Television shows set in England
Costume drama television series
BBC television dramas
1970s British drama television series
1970s British television miniseries
Television series set in the 19th century
English-language television shows
1970s British romance television series